Kevin Meyer is an American filmmaker, director, and writer. He is known for movies such as 12 Mighty Orphans, A Smile Like Yours and Perfect Alibi. Meyer attended the USC School of Cinematic Arts and co-directed a 30-minute film called Divided We Fall with Jeff Burr. The film went on to win fourteen film festival awards and is considered one of the most decorated films in the history of USC Cinema. Meyer also wrote, produced, and directed a series of short documentaries for the National Museum of the United States Army.

Filmography
 2021, 12 Mighty Orphans, Screenplay 
 2020, The Army Behind the Army, National Museum of the United States Army Documentary Series Producer & Director
 2016, American Con, (Pilot) Producer & Writer
 2013, Game Day with Rex & Kevo, (Pilot) Director & Producer
 2013, Army Mail National Museum of the United States Army Documentary Short
 1997, A Smile Like Yours, Writer
 1995, Perfect Alibi, Writer & Director
 1993, Under Investigation, Writer & Director
 1992, Invasion of Privacy, Writer & Director
 1990, Across Five Aprils, Writer & Director
 1989, Stepfather II, Second Unit Director
 1989, Oklahoma Passage, Screenplay
 1986, Wanted Dead or Alive, Assistant Director
 1986, Terror at Tenkiller, Actor
 1982, Divided We Fall, Co-Director

References

External links

 Turner Classic Movie profile for Kevin Meyer
 12 Mighty Orphans Review
 Rotten Tomatoes Movie Profile 

Living people
American film directors
USC School of Cinematic Arts alumni
Year of birth missing (living people)
20th-century American screenwriters
20th-century American male writers
21st-century American screenwriters
21st-century American male writers
American male screenwriters